Aathma Bandhana is a 1992 Indian Kannada-language horror film directed by Srikanth Nahata  and produced by M. Rajagopal. The film stars Shashikumar, Jayapradha and Vaishnavi.

The film is a revenge drama of a woman, played by Vaishnavi, who is killed by her in-laws mercilessly and her spirit entering into a doll. The doll takes up the revenge against each of them who was involved in her murder. The film was a remake of Tamil film Vaa Arugil Vaa (1991) which itself was loosely inspired from 1988 American film Child's Play. The film's music was composed by Rajan–Nagendra and cinematography is by D. V. Ramana.

Cast 
Shashikumar 
Jayapradha
Vaishnavi
Doddanna
Kaminidharan
Thoogudeepa Srinivas
Vajramuni
Ramakrishna
Mysore Lokesh
Shani Mahadevappa

Soundtrack 
The music of the film was composed by Rajan–Nagendra with lyrics by Chi. Udaya Shankar.

References

External links 

 

1992 films
1990s Kannada-language films
Indian horror films
Kannada remakes of Tamil films
Films scored by Rajan–Nagendra
1992 horror films
Films about witchcraft
Indian horror film remakes
Indian remakes of American films